Skyjacked may refer to:

 Aircraft hijacking
 Skyjacked (film), 1972 U.S. film
 Skyjacked (TV episode) a 2017 animated short from the series Justice League Action, see List of Justice League Action episodes

See also

 
 Skyjacker (disambiguation)
 Skyjack (disambiguation)
 sky (disambiguation)
 hijack
 Air pirate (disambiguation)
 Sky pirate (disambiguation)